The Dodge 400 was a mid-size car built by Dodge.  It was similar to the Chrysler LeBaron of the same era.  The 400 was introduced for the 1982 model year but renamed and merged into the Dodge 600 lineup just two years later. An improved version of Chrysler's K-cars, it was called the Super K platform.

Design
While heavily dependent on the K-car, the suspension geometry was revised with computer-aided design (CAD), one of Chrysler's first forays into this area. Aside from the suspension modifications, the interior was plusher and the front and rear designs were different. To provide higher comfort than in the regular K-cars, particular care was paid to sound proofing, with a redesigned firewall and additional isolating material throughout.

Aside from the stacked-slat grille being different from that of the LeBaron, the 400 was somewhat less ornate overall. Faux louvres on the front fenders were unique to the 400.

Model years

1982

The 400 was intended to be a more upmarket version of the Aries and a corporate twin of the downsized LeBaron. It was originally only available as a two-door coupé. In the spring of 1982 two additional bodystyles appeared: a convertible and a four-door sedan. The 400's suspension, while soft, was somewhat firmer than that of its LeBaron sister.

This was Dodge's first convertible since the 1971 Challenger and one of the first domestically-manufactured convertibles since 1976, when Cadillac had phased out the Eldorado convertible.

The 400 was available in two trim levels: base and LS. Engine choices were limited to a 2.2 L inline-four engine or an optional Mitsubishi-sourced 2.6 L "Silent Shaft" four-cylinder; this was only available coupled to an automatic. The convertible came with the Mitsubishi-sourced engine as standard. Outputs were  respectively.

1983
There were no major changes made for 1983 other than the LS trim being omitted from the lineup. During 1983, the 400 sedan was replaced by the longer wheelbase Dodge 600. The coupes and convertibles remained on the shorter wheelbase but were rebadged as Dodge 600 from 1984.

Production
Production figures:

References

External links

400
Front-wheel-drive vehicles
Mid-size cars
Coupés
Convertibles
Sedans
Cars introduced in 1982
Cars discontinued in 1983